Gobabis is a city in eastern Namibia. It is the regional capital of the Omaheke Region, and the district capital of the Gobabis electoral constituency. Gobabis is situated  down the B6 motorway from Windhoek to Botswana. Gobabis is in the heart of the cattle farming area. In fact Gobabis is so proud of its cattle farming that a statue of a large Brahman bull with the inscription "Cattle Country" greets visitors to the town. Gobabis also has its own local Airport.

History

Etymology and pre-colonial history
The area around Gobabis and along the Nossob River had a strong population of elephants. The settlement itself was a base camp for ivory hunters and a trading post for elephant tusks.

In 1856 a mission station was established by one Friederich Eggert of the Rhenish Missionary Society. In the latter half of the 19th century and the early 20th century several conflicts flared up between the Ovambanderu and the Khauas Khoikhoi, as well as between the settlers and the indigenous people. Gobabis is in an area where the Herero and the Nama people fought wars against one another, as well as with settlers from the Cape colony that occupied the land.

According to oral tradition, the earliest name for the settlement in this area was the Khoekhoegowab word ǂKhoandabes, the place where the elephant came to lick. This reason for this name is speculated to be that elephant tusks that would crack in the dry and hot climate of the Omaheke were at times stored right in the settlement's well. The Herero called the place Epako.

Later the settlement was referred to as "Gobabis" by the Whites, this expression was likely derived from goba (argue, quarrel) and bis (place): The place where people quarreled. A common earlier interpretation of the name, ǂkhoa (Elephant) -bes (place), Elephant fountain, was introduced by Heinrich Vedder and gained wide acceptance. Vedder also opined that it was Amraal Lambert, Captain of the Kaiǀkhauan (Khauas Nama) who called the place Gobabis because he could not pronounce ǂKoabes. Apart from linguistic problems, this interpretation was contradicted by an 1845 letter by Reverend Joseph Tindall, a Wesleyan missionary, which states: "Reached Gobabis which I named 'Elephant's fountain'" - a place name like "Place of Altercation" would not bode too well for the missionary station he intended to establish.

Colonial
The Gobabis district was proclaimed by the German authorities in February 1894 and in June the following year Gobabis was occupied by a German garrison. While the military fort, built in 1896–7, has long since disappeared, one of the few buildings dating back to that era is the field hospital, or Lazarett, which has been declared a national monument.

Geography

Climate
Gobabis has a semi-arid climate (BSh, according to the Köppen climate classification), with hot summers and cool winters (with mild days and chilly nights).

Economy

Gobabis continues to grow as a town due to goods being transported from the mines of landlocked Botswana to the Namibian port of Walvis Bay, and furthermore from consumer goods being imported into Namibia from Gauteng in South Africa. The transport route is known as the Trans-Kalahari Corridor. Gobabis is connected to the Namibian railway system. The passenger train that used to run to the capital Windhoek four times a week no longer takes passengers. The town hosts a state hospital, a state clinic and a private hospital, banking and shopping facilities. Legare Stadium is located in the town.

Politics

Local
Gobabis is governed by a municipal council that has seven seats. The town has its own local party, the Gobabis Residents' Association (GRA) which won three council seats in the 1998 local authority election and one seat in 2004.

The 2015 local authority election was won by SWAPO which gained 3,077 votes and five seats. One seat each was won by the Democratic Turnhalle Alliance (DTA, 682 votes) and the National Unity Democratic Organisation (NUDO, 153 votes). SWAPO also won the 2020 local authority election but lost majority control over the municipal council. It obtained 1,986 votes and gained three seats. One seat each went to the Landless People's Movement (LPM, a new party registered in 2018, 818 votes), the GRA (681 votes), NUDO (440 votes) and the Popular Democratic Movement (PDM), formerly DTA, with 338 votes.

Regional
Gobabis is the regional capital of the Omaheke Region. Gobabis Constituency covers most of the town area except for its eastern township of Nossobville which belongs to the Kalahari Constituency.

Education
Gobabis is home to Wennie du Plessis Secondary School, which began as an Afrikaans-speaking school. With the government abolition of non-English education after grade 4 at independence, Afrikaner students endeavoured to start a private school, and the Gobabis Gymnasium in January 2000 with 67 students from grades 8 to 11 and 6 teachers. In January 2002, 122 students were reported, and on December 2, 2004, the school was registered to teach grades 1 through 12. Primary school education officially was started in January 2005.

Notable landmarks

The most notable landmark upon entering Gobabis from Windhoek is the Cattle Country Statue.

Partner cities
  Smallingerland, Netherlands

Residents
 Laura McLeod-Katjirua, former Omaheke Regional Governor and SWAPO Deputy Secretary-General
 Keharanjo Nguvauva, Paramount Chief of the Ovambanderu
 Shafimana Ueitele, Lawyer

References

External links
 Official web site

 
Cities in Namibia
Populated places in the Omaheke Region
Regional capitals in Namibia
Populated places established in 1856